The growling grass frog (Ranoidea raniformis), also commonly known as the southern bell frog, warty swamp frog and erroneously as the green frog, is a species of ground-dwelling tree frog native to southeastern Australia, ranging from southern South Australia along the Murray River though Victoria to New South Wales, with populations through Tasmania. This species' common names vary between states; the name southern bell frog applies to New South Wales, growling grass frog in Victoria and South Australia, and green and gold frog in Tasmania. This species has been introduced to New Zealand.

Description

The growling grass frog is a very large, ground-dwelling tree frog up to 10 cm (almost 4 in) from snout to vent. It is a mottled bright green and bronze colour above, often with dark brown enameled bumps. It has a pale cream underside, with a faint cobbling pattern. A pale stripe runs from the side of the head down the flanks as a skin fold. The thighs are blue-green in colour.

There are a series of shallow bumps over its back. This frog closely resembles the green and golden bell frog (Ranoidea aurea), but is distinguished by the shallow bumps on its back, a shorter call, and a slightly different head and snout shape. The tympanum is visible in these frogs.

The tadpoles are also very large (up to 9.5 cm or 3.7 in). The tadpoles often have a coppery pigment along their sides and an iridescent green sheen along their backbones.

Ecology and behaviour
This species is associated with large swamps, permanent dam impoundments, ponds, and lakes (particularly ones with reeds) in woodland, shrubland, open and coastal areas.

This frog is an agile climber, but is most often found among dense reeds or along swampy grasslands. It hunts and basks in the sun during the day. Growling grass frogs reportedly hunt other frogs by zoning into the sound of their calls.

The call is a three part moaning "craw-ork ar-ar", rising and then falling in tone (described as the sound of a duck or goose being strangled). The males develop black, rough nuptial pads on their thumbs during the breeding season, which occurs during spring through to late summer. Females have the ability to hiss when threatened. The eggs (up to several thousand) are distributed in a loose pile. These frogs stay in tadpole stage for at least one year.

This frog is believed to be in decline across much of its range. In some regions, it has disappeared altogether, but in others it remains locally abundant (such as parts of northern Victoria and the Riverland in South Australia, associated with the Murray River). The Growling Grass Frog has been regularly recorded from suburban Melbourne and Geelong, with similar records from regional cities and occasional records from Adelaide.

As a pet
It is kept as a pet; in Australia, this animal may be kept in captivity with the appropriate permit.

References

Robinson, M. 2002. A Field Guide to Frogs of Australia. Australian Museum/Reed New Holland: Sydney.
Antsis, M. 2002. Tadpoles of South Eastern Australia
Frogs of Australia -Frog call available here.
Frog Australia Network
Article Road: List of All Frog Breeds: Things You Can Do to Ensure Your Frog Has a Long, Happy and Healthy Life: Growling Grass Frog
Department of Environment, Climate Change and Water, New South Wales: Amphibian Keeper's Licence: Species Lists

Litoria
Amphibians of South Australia
Amphibians of New South Wales
Amphibians of the Australian Capital Territory
Amphibians of Victoria (Australia)
Amphibians of Tasmania
Endangered fauna of Australia
Amphibians described in 1867
Frogs of Australia
Taxobox binomials not recognized by IUCN